Buguruslanovka (Boğoroslan) is a rural locality (a village) in Maximovksky Selsoviet, Sterlitamaksky District, Bashkortostan, Russia. The population was 233 as of 2010. There are 3 streets.

Geography 
Buguruslanovka is located 42 km west of Sterlitamak (the district's administrative centre) by road. Petrovka is the nearest rural locality.

References 

Rural localities in Sterlitamaksky District